Yuri Kozukata is a fictional character and the main protagonist introduced in the 2014 Wii U video game Fatal Frame: Maiden of Black Water by Koei Tecmo. In the game, when Yuri was younger, her family all died in a traffic accident, leaving her the only survivor. As a result of this accident, she was left with the ability to see ghosts, often referred to as the "Sixth Sense" in the series.

Development
The main cast went through a number of revisions, although a male character was decided upon early on. Yuri was created relatively quickly and also the character's clothing was designed to make them look "sexy" when it got wet. The character was a combination of elements from proposals for games in the fatal frame series. A mechanic being tested in the game had the necessity to keep dry, initially inspired by the sweating mechanic from Dead or Alive 5. While this was toned down, dampness being tied to the character's well-being remained in the game. This aspect was suggested by Ohtani. The graphics engine used technology from Dead or Alive 5, with one of the main points of aesthetic similarity was the sexy look of the female character.

Appearances

In Fatal Frame: Maiden of Black Water
Yuri appears in a Fatal Frame: Maiden of Black Water as a playable character. In the first chapter, Hisoka and Yuri go to Mikomori Onsen to search for a photo album Ren Hojo is interested in, and Hisoka instructs Yuri on how to use the Camera Obscura and her shadow reading to find the album. They retrieve the photo album, but on their way out of the house, Yuri is attacked by a ghost and has to fend it off with the camera. Hisoka apologizes for bringing Yuri with her on the mission.

In other media
Yuri also became the basis of a DLC costume in the Nintendo Switch version of the game Nights of Azure 2 and reappeared as a summonable Assist Trophy in Super Smash Bros. Ultimate, where Yuri uses a camera and stunning the opponents with a camera and poisoning them.

Gameplay
Yuri has a special power that allows her to see people spirits who have been "spirited away" that reveals disturbing sights in her surroundings as well as bring them back as a normal being. Previewing from the original Fatal Frame: Maiden of Black Water, She navigate environments using an interactive map and can either walk or perform a sprint. During exploration, the characters are confronted by hostile ghosts that attack and damage them through touch. If a ghost grabs her, she can either dodge or break free from their grip.

The only means of defense and attack for her is the Camera Obscura, an antique camera that is used from a first-person perspective. The camera is controlled using the Wii U GamePad, with shots of varying proximity and angles affecting how much damage the ghost takes. The most damaging is a "fatal frame", which hits a ghost's weak spot. During combat, after a shot is taken, fragments of a ghost will appear around them.

Aside from the Camera Obscura, other factors are present in the play. Yuri can glimpse pieces of a ghost's past upon defeating them or when they launch a special attack. Characters can also concentrate on items in the environment related to missing people, generating a shade that leads them to the person's location. A wetness meter tracks how damp the character gets when navigating environments. The amount of wetness has positive and negative effects on her being wet increases the damage done by the Camera Obscura while increasing the number of ghosts present in an area and attacks causing more damage. In addition, characters can be inflicted with a status ailment from dark-colored ghosts or from a special attack: this ailment decreases vision and defense, and deteriorating health. The ailment is only lifted by defeating all the enemies in the area or using an item to remove all wetness.

Reception
Since appearing in Fatal Frame: Maiden of Black Water, Yuri has received mixed to negative reception. GameSpots Alexa Ray Corriae was unimpressed by the main character that was yet being underdeveloped. Daniel Krupa of IGN praised the character roles for being balanced out. Ryan Bates of Game Revolution, found out that the character was introduced early as confusing. VideoGamer.com's Tom Orry praised the character while feeling that Yuri's revealing outfits clashed with the game's atmosphere. Famitsu also criticized the attire of Yuri for disrupting the atmosphere. Dengeki and Eurogamer's Aoife Wilson both faulted the character of Yuri in comparison to the previous game. Dengeki noted the character's realistic movement and said that it gave the main character a high quality feel. The character was widely criticised as she became too erotic instead of being scary at the game. Multiple reviewers mentioned and generally faulted the stiff controls and character movement. The Western release included Nintendo-themed costumes based on popular characters Princess Zelda and Samus Aran. These costumes replaced lingerie and swimsuit outfits featured in the Japanese release for Yuri.

References

Fatal Frame
Female characters in video games
Fictional ghost hunters
Fictional Japanese people in video games
Fictional photographers
Fictional sole survivors
Horror video game characters
Koei Tecmo protagonists
Orphan characters in video games
Video game characters introduced in 2014